Lewis Galoob (November 22, 1918 – August 4, 1971) was an American entrepreneur, inventor and the founder of Lewis Galoob Toys.

Early life 
Lewis Galoob was born in Oklahoma City, Oklahoma, on November 22, 1918, as the third-youngest of seven children. His parents, Samuel "Sam" Galoob (1883-1973)  and Sarah Leah Galoob (née Tarbis, 1887-1935), were both of Jewish descent, and originally from Russia and Germany respectively. He was married to his wife Barbara for 25 years.

Career 
In 1954, Galoob founded Lewis Galoob Toys with his wife, originally as an import business. The California-based company later became a toy and stationary distributor. Later, after Lewis Galoob fell ill, leadership of Galoob fell to their son, waterbed salesman David Galoob. The company then grew into one of the U.S. leading toy companies before being acquired by Hasbro in 1999. Galoob's most successful products include Micro Machines and Game Genie.

Death 
Galoob died in San Francisco on August 4, 1971.

References

1918 births
1971 deaths
20th-century American businesspeople
Businesspeople from Oklahoma

American people of Jewish descent
American toy industry businesspeople